Ashok Parnami (born 4 January 1954) is an Indian politician
He has served as State president of Bharatiya Janata Party Rajasthan and mayor of Jaipur.

Political experience
Active member of Bharatiya Janata Party (BJP).
Former MLA, Adarsh Nagar Constituency Area, Jaipur.
Former State Treasurer, BJP Rajasthan.
General Secretary, Jaipur City, BJP
Mayor, Jaipur Nagar Nigam (2004–2008)

References

Politicians from Jaipur
Rajasthani politicians
1954 births
Living people
Members of the Rajasthan Legislative Assembly
Rajasthan municipal councillors
Mayors of places in Rajasthan
Bharatiya Janata Party politicians from Rajasthan